The 1864 United States presidential election in Tennessee took place on November 8, 1864, as part of the 1864 United States presidential election. The state legislature chose 10 electors to the Electoral College, who voted for president and vice president.

Tennessee voted for incumbent Republican President Abraham Lincoln. The state (along with Louisiana) chose electors for the election after being captured early in the American Civil War. However, due to issues related to the Civil War, their votes were rejected. 

The vote was reported at about 30,000 for Lincoln and 5,000 for McClellan by the Chicago Tribune newspaper, but stated that many ballot boxes were destroyed by Confederate guerrillas and thus the exact number was not known.

If these figures are taken to be correct, or even remotely close to correct, this is the best Republican performance ever in Tennessee.

Footnotes

References

Tennessee
1864
1864 Tennessee elections